The following is a table of all Hindi songs recorded by Runa Laila till date:

Film songs

Non-film songs

Album songs

References

Laila, Runa